William VII "the Young" of Auvergne was a Count of the region of Auvergne, France during the years 1145–1168. He accompanied the French king, Louis VII, on the Second Crusade.

William was the first Count of Auvergne to be given the title Dauphin (Prince). What is by convenience called the dauphinate of Auvergne was in reality the remnant of the county of Auvergne after the usurpation of William VII around 1155 by his uncle, William VIII the Old.

The young count was able to maintain his status in part of his county, especially Beaumont, Chamalières, and Montferrand. Some authors have therefore named William VII and his descendants "counts of Clermont" (although this risks confusion with the county of Clermont in Beauvaisais and the episcopal county of Clermont in Auvergne). The majority of authors, however, anticipating the formalization of the dauphinate in 1302, choose to call William VII and his successors the dauphins of Auvergne. Still others, out of convenience, choose to call these successors the "counts-dauphins of Auvergne."

The title of dauphin of Auvergne was derived from William VII's mother, who was the daughter of the Dauphin de Viennois, Guigues IV. This meant that William VII's male descendants were usually given "Dauphin" as a second name.

References

Counts of Auvergne
Year of birth unknown
Year of death unknown
Christians of the Second Crusade